In anthropology, first contact is the first meeting of two communities previously without contact with one another. Notable examples of first contact are those between the Spanish Empire and the Arawak in 1492; and the Aboriginal Australians with Europeans in 1788 when the First Fleet arrived in Sydney.

Such contact is sometimes described as a "discovery", such as the British and United States did by creating the legal theory of the "Doctrine of Discovery". It is generally the more technologically complex society that is able to travel to new geographic regions to make contact with those more isolated, less technologically complex societies.  However, some object to the application of such a word to human beings, which is why "first contact" is generally preferred. The use of the term "discovery" tends to occur more in reference to geography than cultures; for an example of a common discovery debate, see Discoverer of the Americas.

The fascination with first contact has gone through many transformations since the Age of Discovery, one of the earliest narratives being about contacting the Ten Lost Tribes and Prester John, and continues today as a trope in science fiction about extraterrestrial first contact, as well as being manifest in contemporary space exploration (for example the Pioneer plaque).

Establishing contact with uncontacted peoples is still attempted, despite the negative effects, history and opposition by indigenous peoples, advocacy groups and specialized institutions like FUNAI.

Consequences 
The historical record indicates that when one culture is significantly more technologically advanced than the other, this side will be favored by the disruptive nature of conflict, often with dire consequences for the other society, but the introduction of disease plays a critical role in the process. More-isolated peoples who lived across broader territories in low-density succumbed to the illnesses brought from the comparatively-higher density of Europe. The Indigenous populations simply had not had the time to develop immunity to the foreign diseases, all of which introduced at once, to which the more urbanised European populations had had many years to develop some population immunity.

History 
Long before contemporary uncontacted peoples, there were many more cases of communities and states being isolated from each other, sometimes only having poor knowledge of each other and poor contact. One such case is the poor formal contact between Europe and China in the course of the long history of the Silk Road trade and later contact with the Mongol Empire. Frustration with the lack of contact gave rise to the characterization of China as isolationist, and after being identified with Greater India and Prester John, the European powers, such as the Portuguese Prince Henry the Navigator, attempted to reach the isolated Greater India by travelling westward. The European colonial powers thereby mistakenly identified the Americas as the West Indies - a part of Greater India - and named the indigenous peoples of the Americas incorrectly as "Indians". This contacting has been called one-sided "discovery" as is the case with discovery doctrine, and has been reinvented contemporarily by narratives of first contact beyond Earth finding its way into actual space exploration (for example the Pioneer plaque). It has been argued that, for colonialism, this seeking out of first contact proved to be a crucial element to gain control over knowledge and representation of the other, fetishizing and objectifying contact and its place on the frontier drawing a long history of one-sided contact, until today with indigenous peoples and specifically uncontacted peoples.

Notable examples 
Numerous important instances of first contact have occurred without detailed contemporary recordings across Eurasia and Africa, including the 330 BC invasions of Alexander the Great from Persia to India and the establishment of Romano-Chinese relations in the 2nd century AD. However, well-established trade routes from prehistoric times meant that many of the cultures would have been aware of the other before they met.

See also

References 

Anthropology
Uncontacted peoples